Jesup Wakeman Scott High School is a public high school located in the Old West End neighborhood of Toledo, Ohio.  It is part of Toledo Public Schools.  It was named for a former editor of The Toledo Blade from 1844 to 1847. Scott was an entrepreneur, philanthropist and well-known civic leader who envisioned Toledo as the "Future Great City of the World."  The current high school building was built in 1913.
After receiving a $1 million grant from the Bill and Melinda Gates Foundation, Scott High School began a transformation from a comprehensive high school to four small learning academies.  Each academy, or "Small School" is based on a different career pathway.

The Scott Bulldogs wear maroon and white for athletic events. Their basketball program has been historically known as a powerhouse in the Toledo City League with their biggest rivals being the Macomber Macmen and the Libbey Cowboys. Macomber was the big rivalry until that school's closure in 1991, and Libbey was the main rival until it was closed in 2010.  Scott's oldest rivals are the Waite Indians, as their school was built a year after Scott and prompted an annual Thanksgiving Day football matchup that ran from 1914–1963 and generated the interest of many Midwestern newspapers. Scott is also known for its internationally known marching band the "Fantastic Dancing Machines," having one of the premier marching bands in the mid-west, who have won numerous awards in band competitions throughout the United States. The band has performed all over the country. The band was directed by Florida A&M University alum Gus Walker from 1970–1977, then rose to fame under the baton of Mr. Edward Dixon beginning in 1978. The band is now ran by Scott Walters.

The actual school building on Collingwood Avenue was temporarily closed for a $42 million renovation that took place. It was finished in December 2011. Prior to that, the students, staff and faculty spent 2.5 school years at the closed DeVilbiss High School.

The TPS board approved a resolution in November 2013 to have new stadiums built at Scott and Woodward High School after their previous facilities were torn down during renovation and construction.  They were built in time for the 2014 season.  Scott previously had two stadiums: a 10,367-seat stadium named after Fred L. Siebert that was demolished in February 1970 when it was condemned, and a roughly 4,000-seat replacement that was dedicated in 1971.

Ohio High School Athletic Association State Championships

 Boys Basketball – 1990 
 Boys Track and Field – 1909*, 1910*, 1912*, 1913*, 1917, 1918, 1934, 1935, 1938 
 Boys Cross Country – 1934, 1935, 1936 
 Girls Track and Field – 1975 
 *Titles won by Central High School prior to being replaced by Scott High School in 1913.

Toledo City League titles

Football: 1927, 1928*, 1929*, 1930*, 1938*, 1939, 1950, 1971, 1972, 1984, 1985, 2014
Volleyball:
Golf:
Boys Basketball: 1928–29, 1957–58, 1959–60*, 1971–72, 1973–74, 1974–75, 1975–76, 1976–77, 1977–78, 1979–80, 1981–82, 1983–84, 1984–85, 1985–86, 1989–90, 1991–92, 2000–01, 2005–06, 2014–15
Girls Basketball:
Wrestling: 1999–2000, 2002–03, 2003–04, 2004–05
 Boys Soccer: 2021-2022
Boys Track and Field: 1928, 1929, 1930, 1931, 1932, 1934, 1935, 1936, 1965, 1967, 1968, 1969, 1990
Girls Track and Field: 1972, 1976
Softball:
(years marked with an asterisk (*) denote a shared title)

Notable alumni

Ron Allen (1962): Former MLB player (St. Louis Cardinals)
Odell Barry (1960): played football for the University of Findlay and in the AFL for the Denver Broncos
Effi Slaughter Barry: former wife of Marion Barry and First Lady of Washington D.C.
Morley Baer (1931): famed photographer and teacher
Bernard Benton: retired boxer, former WBC Cruiserweight (boxing) champion
Don Collins (1976): basketball player for Washington State University, the NBA, and CBA
Stanley Cowell: jazz pianist, co-founder of the Strata-East Records label and professor
Mari Evans: poet, writer, and dramatist associated with the Black Arts Movement
Willie Harper (1969): football player for the University of Nebraska and the San Francisco 49ers
Jon Hendricks (1939): Award-winning jazz vocalist and lyricist, founder of influential jazz vocal trio Lambert, Hendricks, & Ross
Lindell Holmes: retired boxer, former IBF Super Middleweight champion
Fred Ladd (1945): television and film writer/producer, one of the first to introduce Japanese animated cartoons to North America
Wilbert McClure (1956): Olympic gold medal boxer and Pan American Games gold medalist.
Brenda Morehead (1975): Olympic track and field athlete
Melvin Newbern (1985): basketball player for the University of Minnesota and Detroit Pistons
Roosevelt Nix: American football player
Jim Parker (1953): played football for Ohio State University and the Baltimore Colts
William Everett Potter, United States Army officer
Lyman Spitzer (1929?) : Famous American theoretical plasma physicist, astronomer and mountaineer
Dick Szymanski (1951): played football for Notre Dame and the Baltimore Colts
Art Tatum: influential jazz pianist and virtuoso
Mildred Taylor (1961): author, known for her works exploring the struggle faced by African-American families in the Deep South
Ernie Vick (1918): Former MLB player (St. Louis Cardinals)
Nate Washington (2001): played football for Tiffin University and in the NFL for the Pittsburgh Steelers and Tennessee Titans
Ernie Wright (1957): played football for Ohio State, and in the AFL for the LA/San Diego Chargers and Cincinnati Bengals

References

External links
District Website
Save Our Scott

High schools in Toledo, Ohio
Public high schools in Ohio